O'Neil Wilson (born January 17, 1978 in Scarborough, Ontario) is a Canadian football wide receiver who is currently a free agent. He has previously played for the BC Lions of the Canadian Football League. He was drafted in the 3rd round of the 2004 CFL Draft by the Montreal Alouettes. He played college football at UConn.

Wilson has also played for the Winnipeg Blue Bombers and Hamilton Tiger-Cats. He was also spent a brief stint on the Toronto Argonauts practice roster in 2011.

External links
Toronto Argonauts bio
BC Lions bio

1978 births
Living people
BC Lions players
Canadian football wide receivers
UConn Huskies football players
Hamilton Tiger-Cats players
Montreal Alouettes players
Players of Canadian football from Ontario
Sportspeople from Scarborough, Toronto
Canadian football people from Toronto
Winnipeg Blue Bombers players
Toronto Argonauts players